Deepak Chopra's Buddha is a comic book on the life of Buddha, featuring artwork by Virgin Comics artists, written by Deepak Chopra.

It was adapted into a comic mini-series from Chopra's 2007 novel Buddha: A Story of Enlightenment, with art by Harshvardhan Kadan.

References

Buddhist comics
Biographical comics
Comics set in the 5th century BC
Works about religious leaders
2008 comics debuts
2008 non-fiction books
Comics based on real people